"Sara" is a song recorded by the American rock band Starship which reached number-one on the U.S. Billboard Hot 100 chart on March 15, 1986. It was sung by Mickey Thomas, of the newly renamed band Starship, from their first album Knee Deep in the Hoopla; for this single, Grace Slick provided the backing vocals.

The recording became one of the best-selling singles of 1986 in North America. It was the band's second number-one hit after the song "We Built This City" hit the mark a few months earlier in 1985. It also became the band's first number-one song on the adult contemporary chart, where it remained for three weeks. Although written by Peter and Ina Wolf, the song was named for Thomas's wife at the time, Sara (née Kendrick).

Reception
Cash Box called it a "melodic ballad [that] has a biting rock edge led by Mickey Thomas’ riveting vocal" and said it has "an ethereal chorus and shy guitars."

Music video
The music video for "Sara" prominently features actress Rebecca De Mornay as the song's titular character and Thomas in a storyline about a relationship ending, on a Dust Bowl farm in the midwest, with frequent flashbacks to what is presumably Thomas's character's childhood and the tornado that wrecked his home and took the life of his beloved mother. It ends with a panoramical view of the farm, with Thomas walking down the dirt road Rebecca drove down, and another dust cloud coming in. The flashback portions of the music video were set in the 1950s and directed by Francis Delia.

Charts

Weekly charts

Year-end charts

See also
List of Billboard Hot 100 number-one singles of 1986
List of number-one adult contemporary singles of 1986 (U.S.)

References

1980s ballads
1985 songs
1985 singles
1986 singles
Billboard Hot 100 number-one singles
Cashbox number-one singles
Pop ballads
RCA Records singles
Rock ballads
RPM Top Singles number-one singles
Songs written by Peter Wolf (producer)
Starship (band) songs